307th may refer to:

307th (RHA) (South Nottinghamshire Hussars Yeomanry) Field Regiment, Royal Artillery, unit of the British Army formed as volunteer cavalry in 1794
307th Air Division, inactive United States Air Force organization
307th Air Refueling Squadron, inactive United States Air Force unit
307th Bomb Wing, Air Reserve Component (ARC) of the United States Air Force
307th Bombardment Squadron, (later 501st Fighter-Bomber Squadron), 10 February 1942 – 1 May 1944
307th Cavalry Regiment (United States), cavalry unit of the United States Army during World War I and the interwar period
307th Fighter Squadron, part of Air Force Reserve Command's 414th Fighter Group stationed at Seymour Johnson Air Force Base, North Carolina
307th Hospital of Chinese People's Liberation Army (Chinese: 307医院), is a hospital in China
307th Infantry Brigade (United Kingdom) (307 Bde) was a formation of the British Army from surplus Royal Artillery personnel retrained as infantry
307th Infantry Regiment (United States), National Army unit first organized for service in World War I as part of the 77th Infantry Division in Europe
307th Marine Battalion, navy branch of the Romanian Armed Forces, operating in the Black Sea and on the Danube
307th Operations Group, Air Reserve Component (ARC) of the United States Air Force
307th Rifle Division (Soviet Union), raised in 1941 as a standard Red Army rifle division
307th Troop Carrier Squadron, USAF squadron activated as an operational training unit (OTU) in March 1943

See also
307 (number)
307 (disambiguation)
307, the year 307 (CCCVII) of the Julian calendar
307 BC